Becky Duncan Massey is a Republican member of the Tennessee Senate for the 6th district, encompassing Knoxville and Knox County.

Biography

Early life and education
Becky Duncan Massey was born on January 2, 1955. Her father was John Duncan, Sr., Mayor of Knoxville from 1959 to 1964, and a U.S. Representative for Tennessee's 2nd congressional district from 1965 to 1988. Her brother is John J. (Duncan), who took up their father's district at the federal level. Their uncle, Joe D. Duncan, is a former Tennessee Court of Criminal Appeals Judge. She received a Bachelor of Science in Business Administration from the University of Tennessee at Knoxville in 1977. She is a member of Alpha Omicron Pi, a women's fraternity.

Career

Politician
She served as a delegate to the 1988 Republican National Convention. In November 2011, she was elected to the sixth district in the Tennessee Senate, after Republican senator Jamie Woodson resigned. She defeated Democratic candidate Gloria Johnson with 64 percent of the vote. She was reelected in November 2012 and in November 2016.

Executive
She is the former Executive Director of the Sertoma Center, a company that provides residential and day services to individuals with intellectual and developmental disabilities in Knoxville and now serves as a consultant.

Board memberships
Massey is Past-President of the Tennessee Community Organizations, and a board member of the Knox County Community Action Committee. She is a former board member of the Dogwood Arts Festival, Overlook Mental Health Center, and Big Brothers Big Sisters.

Personal life
Massey is married to Morton Massey, a software developer, and they have two daughters, Courtney and Kristen. She has one granddaughter:  Bailey.  She attends a Presbyterian church, New Life Gathering.

References

External links
Senator Massey's Tennessee General Assembly web page
Senator Massey's office web site

1955 births
21st-century American politicians
21st-century American women politicians
American Presbyterians
Living people
Politicians from Knoxville, Tennessee
Republican Party Tennessee state senators
University of Tennessee alumni
Women state legislators in Tennessee